Elysius amapaensis is a moth of the family Erebidae. It was described by Rego Barros in 1971. It is found in Brazil.

References

amapaensis
Moths described in 1971
Moths of South America